The Honda D series inline-four cylinder engine is used in a variety of compact models, most commonly the Honda Civic, CRX, Logo, Stream, and first-generation Integra. Engine displacement ranges between 1.2 and 1.7 liters. The D Series engine is either SOHC or DOHC, and might include VTEC variable valve lift. D-series production commenced 1984 and ended 2005. D-series engine technology culminated with production of the D15B 3-stage VTEC (D15Z7) which was available in markets outside of the United States. Earlier versions of this engine also used a single port fuel injection system Honda called PGM-CARB, signifying the carburetor was computer controlled.

D12 series engines (1.2 liter)

D12A 
 Found in:
 1986-1988 Honda City GG (Japanese Market) 
 Displacement: 1237 cc (75.5 cu in)
 Bore and Stroke: 72 mm x 76 mm (2.83 in x 2.99 in)
 Compression: 9,5:1
 Power:  at 6,500 rpm 
 Torque:  at 4,000 rpm 
 Valvetrain: SOHC (4 valves per cylinder)
 Fuel Control: Single Carburetor

D12B1

 Found in:
 1988-1990 Honda Civic (European Market)
 Displacement: 
 Bore and Stroke: 
 Compression: 8,6:1
 Power:  at 6300 rpm
 Torque:  at 3500 rpm
 Valvetrain: SOHC (4 valves per cylinder)
 Fuel Control: Single Carburetor PGM-CARB

D13 series engines (1.3 liter)

D13B1

 Found in:
 1988–1995 Honda Civic EC (European Market)
 Displacement : 
 Bore and Stroke : 
 Compression : 9.5:1
 Power :  at 6300 rpm
 Torque:  at 3100 rpm
 Valvetrain : SOHC (4 valves per cylinder)
 Fuel Control : Single Carburetor CARB

D13B2

 Found in:
 1992–1995 Honda Civic DX/EX (European Market)
 Displacement: 
 Bore and Stroke: 
 Compression: 9:1
 Power:  at 6300 rpm
 Torque:  at 3100 rpm
 Valvetrain: SOHC, four valves per cylinder
 Cam Gear: 38 teeth
 Piston Code: PM1G
 Head Code: PM3
 Fuel Control: Single electronic carburetor PGM-CARB
 ECU: P01  OBD-0

D13B4

 Found in:
 1996–2002 Honda City LXi/EXi/DX, 1995-2000 Honda Civic EK2
 Displacement : 
 Bore and Stroke : 
 Compression:    9.75:1
 Power:  at 6500 rpm (Civic)
 Torque:  at 4700 rpm (City) at 4800 rpm (Civic)
 Valvetrain : SOHC (four valves per cylinder), 16 valves
 Fuel Control : Multi-point fuel Injection, PGM-FI

D13B7

 Found in:
 1998–2001 Honda Logo
 Displacement : 
 Bore and Stroke : 75.0 x 76.0 mm
 Compression : 9.2
 Power :  at 5000 rpm
 Torque :  at 2500 rpm
 Valvetrain : SOHC (2 valves per cylinder)
 Fuel Control : Multi-point fuel Injection, PGM-FI

D13C

 Found in:
 1989–1994 Honda City CE, CE Fit, CE Select, CG, CR-i, CR-i limited, CZ-i, New Fit (Japanese Market)
 Displacement : 
 Bore and Stroke : 73.7mm x 76.0 mm
 Compression : 9.6:1
 Power :  at 6500 rpm
 Torque :  at 5500 rpm
 Valvetrain : SOHC (4 valves per cylinder)
 Fuel Control : Multi-point fuel Injection, PGM-FI

D14 series engines (1.4 liter)

D14A1
 Found in:
 1987–1991 Honda Civic GL and 1990 CRX (European market)
 October 1989 – 1994 Honda Concerto GL (European market)
 Displacement: 
 Bore and Stroke: 
 Compression: 9.3:1
 Power:  at 6,300 rpm in the Concerto
 Torque:  at 4,500 rpm
 Valvetrain: SOHC (four valves per cylinder)
 Fuel Control: Dual Carburetor PGM-CARB
 Piston Code: PM2

D14A2
 Found in:
 1995–1997 Honda Civic MA8 (European Market)
 Displacement : 
 Bore and Stroke : 
 Compression : 9.2:1
 ECU code: P1J
 Power :  at 6,100 rpm
 Torque :  at 5,000 rpm
 Valvetrain : SOHC (4 valves per cylinder)
 Fuel Control : OBD-1, MPFIMulti-point fuel Injection, PGM-FI
 Redline : 6,800 rpm
 Fuel cutout : 7,250 rpm

D14A3
 Found in:
 1996–2000 Honda Civic 1.4i EJ9 (European Market)
 Displacement : 
 Bore and Stroke : 
 Compression : 9.1:1
 ECU code: P3X
 Power :  at 6,000 rpm
 Torque :  at 3,000 rpm
 Valvetrain : SOHC (4 valves per cylinder), non VTEC
 Redline : 6,800 rpm
 Fuel cut: 7,200 rpm
 Fuel Control : OBD2-a, DPFI (SFi – Simplified Fuel injection), 1+3 2+4 injectors thrown together
 Transmission: S40

D14A4
 Found in:
 1996–1998 Honda Civic 1.4iS EJ9 (European Market)
 Displacement : 
 Bore and Stroke : 
 Compression : 9.1:1
 Piston code: P3Y
 Piston Compression height: 29.5 mm
 Piston dish volume: -5.4 cc
 ECU code: P3Y
 Big-end bore: 43 mm
 Rod length (center to center): 138 mm
 Power:  at 6,300 rpm
 Torque :  at 4,500 rpm
 Valvetrain : SOHC, four valves per cylinder, non VTEC
 Red line : 6,800 rpm
 Fuel cut: 7,200 rpm
 Fuel Control : OBD2-a, DPFI (SFi – Simplified Fuel injection), 1+4 2+3 injectors thrown together
 Transmission : S40 (or S4PA for 4AT)
 Deck Height : 207 mm

The D14A3 and D14A4 engines are identical, the difference is the addition of a small gasket under the throttle body in the D14A3 which restricts the air intake of the engine, lowering the power output. This was done in some European countries to suit local insurance categories.

D14A5
 Found in:
 1995 - 1997 Honda Civic MA8 (European Market)
 Displacement : 
 Bore and Stroke : 
 Compression : 9.2:1
 ECU code: P1J
 Power :  at 6,100 rpm
 Valvetrain : SOHC (4 valves per cylinder)
 Fuel Control : OBD-1, MPFIMulti-point fuel Injection, PGM-FI
 Redline : 6,800 rpm
 Fuel cutout : 7,250 rpm

The D14A2 and D14A5 engines are identical, the difference is the addition of a small gasket under the throttle body in D14A5 which restricts the air intake of the engine, lowering the power output. This was done in some European countries to suit local insurance categories.

D14A7
 Found in:
 1997–2000 Honda Civic 1.4i MB2/MB8 (UK Market)
 Displacement: 
 Compression: 9.0:1
 Power:  at 6,000 rpm
 Torque:  at 3,000 rpm
 Valvetrain: SOHC (4 valves per cylinder), non VTEC

D14A8
 Found in:
 1997–2000 Honda Civic 1.4iS MB2/MB8. UK and (at least) Germany.
 Displacement : 
 Compression : 9.0:1
 Power :  at 6,400 rpm
 Torque :  at 4,800 rpm
 Valvetrain : SOHC (4 valves per cylinder), non VTEC

The D14A7 and D14A8 engines are identical, the difference is only one small gasket under the throttle body in D14A7 which restricts the air intake of the engine, this happen in some European countries.

They are also almost identical to the D14A3 and D14A4 engines. Differences are only in the compression ratio and some different mounted components.

D14Z1
 Found in:
 1999–2000 Honda Civic EJ9 (1.4i, Europe)
 Compression: 9.7:1
 Power: 
 Valvetrain: SOHC, 4 valves per cylinder, non VTEC
 Bore and Stroke: 75.0 mm × 79.0 mm (2.95 in × 3.11 in)
 Piston Code: phxg
 Rod Length: 138 mm
 Rod/Stroke: 1.747
 Redline: 6800 rpm
 Fuel cut: 7200 rpm

D14Z2
 Found in:
 1999–2000 Honda Civic EJ9 (1.4iS, Europe)
 Displacement: 
 Compression: 9.7:1
 Power:  at 6,300 rpm
 Valvetrain: SOHC, 4 valves per cylinder, non VTEC
 Bore and Stroke: 75.0 mm × 79.0 mm (2.95 in × 3.11 in)
 Piston Code: phxg
 Redline: 6,800 rpm
 Fuel cut: 7,200 rpm

The D14Z1 and D14Z2 engines are identical, the difference is only one small gasket under the throttle body in D14Z1 which restricts the air intake of the engine, this happen in some European countries.

D14Z3
 Found in:
 1999–2000 Honda Civic MB2 (1.4i, Europe), MB8 (1.4 SR, UK Market)
 Displacement : 
 Compression : 9.0:1
 Power :  at 5,700 rpm
 Torque :  at 3,000 rpm
 Valvetrain : SOHC, 4 valves per cylinder, non VTEC
Redline: 6,800 rpm
Fuel cut : 7,200 rpm

D14Z4
 Found in:
 1999–2001 Honda Civic MB2 (1.4iS), MB8 (1.4SR; UK Market)
 Displacement : 
 Bore and Stroke : 
 Compression : 9.0:1
 Power :  at 6400 rpm
 Torque :  at 4800 rpm
 Valvetrain : SOHC, four valves per cylinder, non VTEC
Redline: 6800 rpm
Fuel cut : 7200 rpm

The D14Z3 and D14Z4 engines are identical, the difference is only one small gasket under the throttle body in D14Z3 which restricts the air intake of the engine, this happen in some European countries.

D14Z5
Found in:
2001–2005 Honda Civic 1.4iS, LS (European market: ES4 nfl)
Engine Name: D14Z5
Displacement: 1396 cc
Bore and Stroke: 75 mm x 79 mm
Compression: 10.4:1
Cylinder Head: 16 valves, SOHC
Red Line: 6400 rpm
Fuel Cutoff: 6600 rpm
Fuel System: Honda PGM-FI
Rod/Stroke Ratio: ?:?
Stock BHP Rating:  at 5600 rpm
Stock torque rating:  at 4300 rpm
Rated Fuel Consumption: 
Ecu Code: PMA

D14Z6
Found in:
2001–2005 Honda Civic 1.4 LS (European market: EP1, EU4, EU7, ES4 fl, ES6)
Engine Name: D14Z6
Displacement: 1,396 cc
Bore and Stroke: 75 mm x 79 mm
Compression: 10.4:1
Cylinder Head: 16 valves, SOHC
Red Line: 6,400 rpm
Fuel Cutoff: 6,600 rpm
Fuel System: Honda PGM-FI
Rod/Stroke Ratio: ?:?
Stock BHP Rating: 90 hp (66 kW) at 5,600 rpm
Stock torque rating: 130 Nm at 4,300 rpm
Rated Fuel Consumption: 
Ecu Code: PMA

D15 series engines (1.5 liter)

D15A1
 Found In:
 1984–1987 Honda CRX
 Displacement : 1,488 cc
 Bore and Stroke : 74.0 x 86.5 mm
 Compression : 9.2:1
 Power :  at 5,500 rpm
 Torque :  at 3,500 rpm
 Valvetrain : SOHC (3 valves per cylinder), non VTEC
 Fuel Control : OBD-0 12/v  PGM-CARB
 Redline : 6,500 rpm
 Economy : 31/38 mpg
 Head code : EW-1
 ECU : –
 Transmission : DA48
 Gear ratios : 2.38/ 1.76/ 1.18/ 0.85/ 0.71
 Final drive ratio : 4.27

D15A2
 Found in :
 1984–1987 Honda CRX HF
 Displacement : 1,488 cc
 Compression : 8.7:1
 Power :  at 5,550 rpm
 Torque :  at 3,500 rpm
 Redline : 5,500 rpm
 Fuel induction: 3 barrel carburetor w/ vacuum secondary
 Valvetrain : 12v CVCC SOHC (8V '84-'86) (8 (4) intake, 4 exhaust, 4 aux (for cvcc chamber))
 Economy : 49/54 mpg
 Gear ratios : 
 49 State:
 3.272/1.666/1.041/0.807/0.714 (Final 4.066)
 Hi-Altitude:
 2.916/1.526/0.960/0.750/0.655 (Final 3.578)
 California:
 2.916/1.526/0.960/0.750/0.655 (Final 2.954)
 1984–1987 Honda CRX DX 
 Displacement : 1,488 cc
 Compression : 9.6:1
 Power :  at 6,000 rpm
 Torque :  at 3,500 rpm
 Redline : 6,500 rpm
 Fuel induction: 3 barrel carburetor w/ vacuum secondary
 Valvetrain : 12V CVCC SOHC (8 intake, 4 exhaust, 4 aux (for cvcc chamber))
 Economy : 38mpg
 Gear ratios : 2.916/1.764/1.181/0.846/0.714 (Final 4.266)
 1987 Honda Civic Wagon RT4WD (Canadian Model)
 Displacement : 1,488 cc
 Compression : 9.2:1
 Power :  at 5,500 rpm
 Torque :  at 3,500 rpm
 Valvetrain : 12 valves, SOHC
 Economy : 31-38 mpg

D15A3

 Found in:
 1985–1987 Honda CRX Si and 1987 Civic Si (AU/NZ)
Stamped with EW3/EW4 1985-1986 before switching to D15A3 stamp in 1987
 1985–1987 Honda Civic 1.5i (Europe)
 1984–1987 Honda CRX 1.5i (Europe)
 1986–1987 Honda Civic Si Hatch (US)
 Displacement : 
 Bore and Stroke : 
 Compression : 8.7:1
 Power : 91 hp (68 kW, 92 ps) at 5500 rpm
 Power :  at 5750 rpm (Europe)
 Torque : 93 lb·ft (12.9 kg/m, 126 Nm) at 4500 rpm
 Valvetrain : SOHC (12 valves, three per cylinder )
 Fuel Control : PGM-FI2

D15A4

D15A5

D15B 
 Found in:
 1988 Honda CRX 1.5X (rare)
 1990 Honda Civic 25XXT Formula (Japanese Market)
 Honda Civic Ferio MX (Japanese Market) EG8
 1998–2001 Honda Capa GA4 (Japanese Market)
 1988-2001 Honda Civic SH4 EF1
 Displacement : 
 Bore and Stroke : 
 Compression : 9.2:1
 Power : 103 hp (77.23 kW, 105 PS) at 6800 rpm
 Torque : 14.1 kgm (133.4 Nm) at 5200 rpm
 Rev limiter : 7200 rpm
 Valvetrain : SOHC (4 valves per cylinder)
 Fuel Control : Twin carburetor PGM-CARB/ Fuel Injected

D15B VTEC 
 Found in:
 1992–1995 Honda Civic Vti (Japanese Market)
 1992–1998 Honda CRX DelSol (Japanese Market)
 Bore and Stroke: 75.0 × 84.5 mm
 Displacement: 
 Rod Length: 137 mm
 Rod/Stroke: 1.63
 Compression: 9.3:1
 Power:  at 6800 rpm
 Torque:  at 5200 rpm
 VTEC Switchover : 4,600 rpm
 Redline: 7200 rpm
 Rev-limiter: 7200 rpm
 Valvetrain: SOHC VTEC (4 valves per cylinder)
 Connecting rod big end diameter : 48 mm
 Fuel Control: OBD-1
 Head Code: P08
 ECU Code: P08 (small case ECU)***

3-stage VTEC
 Found in:
 1995–1998 Honda Civic Ferio Vi (EK3, Japanese market)
 1999-2000 Honda Civic Vi-RS
 2001-2005 Honda Civic JDM VTEC (Japanese market, Europe)
 Bore and Stroke :75,0×84,5 mm
 Displacement : 	
 Rod Length : 137 mm	
 Rod/Stroke : 1.62
 Compression : 9.6:1
 Power :  at 7000 rpm
 Torque: 139 Nm at 5300 rpm
 Redline : 7200 rpm
 Valvetrain : SOHC, four valves per cylinder
 Connecting rod length : 137 mm
 Connecting rod big end diameter : 45 mm
 Fuel Control : OBD2b
 Head Code : P2J-07
 ECU Code: P2J (small case ECU)*** AUTO CVT: P2J-J63*** MT P2J-003*** & ***MT P2J-J11***
 Piston code : P2J

D15B1
 Found in:
 1988–1991 Honda Civic Hatchback
 Displacement : 
 Bore and Stroke : 
 Compression : 9.2:1
 Power : 70 hp (52.2 kW, 71.0 PS) at 5,500 rpm
 Torque : 73 lb·ft (11.4 kgm, 112 Nm) at 3,000 rpm
 Valvetrain : SOHC (4 valves per cylinder) non-VTEC
 Head Code : PM3
 Fuel System : Dual Point injection (PGMFI)
 ECU Code: PM9

D15B2
 Found in:
 1988–1991 Honda Civic GL/DX/LX/CX  (CX Canadian Market)
 1988–1991 Honda Civic Wagon Wagovan/DX
 1988–1991 Honda CRX DX
 1992–1995 Honda Civic LSi Hatch/Saloon (European Market)
 1992–1995 Honda Civic DXi Hatch/Saloon (European Market)
 1990–1995 Honda Concerto (European Market)
 Displacement: 
 Bore and Stroke: 
 Rod Length: 134 mm
 Compression: 9.2:1
 Power:  at 6,000 rpm (US) at 6,000 rpm (Europe)
 Torque: 88 lb·ft (12.2 kg/m, 119 Nm) at 4,700 rpm
 Valvetrain: SOHC (4 valves per cylinder) non-VTEC
 Cam Gear: 38 tooth
 Piston Code: PM3
 Fuel Control: OBD-O DPFI
 Redline: 6,500 rpm, 7,200 rpm rev limiter
 Head Code: PM5
 ECU Code: PM5/P04

D15B3
 Found in:
 1988–1995 Honda Civic Shuttle GL
 1989–1996 Honda Ballade 150-16 & 150 (South Africa)
 1992–1995 Honda Civic LX (NZ model)
 1988–1991 Honda Civic LX/EX (NZ model)
 1992–1995 Honda Civic EX (SA model)
 Displacement : 
 Bore and Stroke : 
 Rod Length : 134 mm
 Piston Code : PM3P
 Compression : 9.2:1
 Power :  at 6000 rpm
 Torque : 89 lb·ft (13.55 kg/m, 121 Nm) at 4500 rpm
 Redline : 6500 rpm
 Valvetrain  : SOHC (4 valves per cylinder)
 Cam Gear : 38 tooth
 Fuel Control :  PGM-CARB
 Transmission : S20

D15B4
 Found in:
 1989–1993 Honda Civic GL (Australian Market)
 Displacement : 
 Bore and Stroke : 
 Compression : 9.2:1
 Power  :  at 5,200 rpm
 Torque :  at 3,800 rpm
 Valvetrain : SOHC (four valves per cylinder)

D15B5
 VTEC-E
 Found in:
 1992–1995 Honda Civic 
 Displacement : 
 Bore and Stroke : 
 Valvetrain : SOHC VTEC (four valves per cylinder)
 Rod Length : 137 mm
 Head Code : P08
 ECU Code : P08-030
 Piston Code : P08-010
 Piston Rod Code : PM6-000
 Fuel Control : OBD-1 PGM-FI

D15B6
 Found in:
 1988–1991 Honda Crx HF
 Displacement : 
 Bore and Stroke : 
 Compression : 9.1:1
 Power :
 ['88-'89] 62 bhp (46.2 kW, 62.9 PS) at 4400 rpm
 ['90-'91] 72 bhp (53.7 kW, 73.0 PS) at 4500 rpm
 Torque : 83 lb·ft (11.5 kg/m, 113 Nm) at 2200 rpm
 Valvetrain : 8-Valve SOHC
 Fuel Control : OBD-0 MPFI
 Head Code : PM-8
colour wiring for heat sensor

D15B7
 
 1992–1995 Honda Civic GLi (Australian model)
 1992–1995 Honda Civic DX/LX
 1992-1995 Honda Civic Cx (Canadian Market)
 1992–1995 Honda Civic LSi Coupé (European Market)
 1993–1995 Honda Civic Del Sol S
 1998-2000 Honda City SX8
 Displacement : 
 Bore and Stroke : 
 Compression : 9.2:1
 Power : 102 hp (76.1 kW, 103 PS) at 5900 rpm
 Torque : 98 lb·ft (13.5 kg/m, 133 Nm) at 5000 rpm
 Valvetrain : 16-valve SOHC (four valves per cylinder)
 Redline: 6500 rpm
 Cam Gear: 38 tooth
 Piston Code : PM3
 Fuel Control : OBD-1 MPFI
 ECU Code: P06
 Head codes: PM 9–6, PM9–8

D15B8
 Found in:
 1992–1995 Honda Civic CX (U.S. model)
 Displacement : 
 Bore and Stroke : 
 Compression : 9.1:1
 Power : 70 hp (52.2 kW, 71.0 PS) at 4500 rpm
 Torque : 83 lb·ft (11.5 kg/m, 113 Nm) at 2800 rpm
 Valvetrain : 8-valve SOHC (two valves per cylinder)
 Fuel cutoff : 5800 rpm
 Cam Gear: 38 tooth
 Fuel Control : OBD-1 MPFI
 ECU Code : P05
 Head codes: PM8-1, PM8-2

D15Y3
 Found in:
 2001–2006 Civic EXi (Africa, Dubai, Pakistan)
 Displacement: 1.5 L, 
 Bore and Stroke: 
 Compression Ratio: 9.3:1 
 Power:  at 6200 rpm (Pakistan)
 Torque:  at 4700 rpm
 Redline Limiter: 6900 rpm
 Valvetrain: 16-valves SOHC, four valves per cylinder (non-VTEC)
 Fuel Control: EFI PGM-FI (Programmed Fuel Injection) OBD-2.

D15Y4
VTEC SOHC or non-VTEC
 Found in:
 2001–2006 Civic VTI (ES8) (VTEC) (Japan, Singapore, Malaysia, Sri Lanka)
 2001–2006 Civic EXi (ES8) (non-VTEC) (Japan, Singapore, Malaysia, Sri Lanka)
 Displacement : 
 Bore and Stroke : 
 Power: VTEC version  at 6400 rpm), non VTEC version  at 6200 rpm)
 Torque : VTEC version 151 Nm (15.1 kgm) at 5000 rpm, non-VTEC version 142 Nm (14.7 kgm) at 4700 rpm
 Valvetrain : SOHC four valves per cylinder (VTEC or non-VTEC)
 Fuel Control : EFI PGM-FI (Programmed Fuel Injection) OBD-2

D15Z1
 VTEC-E
 Found in:
 1992–1995 Honda Civic VX
 1992–1995 Honda Civic VEi (European Market)
 Displacement : 
 Bore and Stroke : 
 Rod Length : 137 mm
 Rod/Stroke : 1.62
 Compression : 9.3:1
 Power : 90 hp (67.1 kW, 91.3 ps) at 5,600 rpm (92 hp at 5,500 rpm; USDM)
 Torque : 98 lb·ft (13.5 kg/m, 133 Nm) at 4,800 rpm (97 lb·ft at 3,000 rpm; USDM)
 Valvetrain : 12-/16-valve SOHC VTEC-E (USDM- Lean Burn Federal Emissions 49 State) (3-4 valves per cyl depending on engine speed)
 VTEC Switchover : 2,500 rpm
 Fuel Control : OBD-1 MPFI
 ECU Code : P07
 Head code: PO7-1

D15Z2
 Found in:
 1993–1995 Honda Civic Breeze (AUDM)
 Displacement : 
 Bore and Stroke : 
 Rod Length : 137 mm
 Rod/Stroke : 1.62
 Compression : 9.2
 Power : 89.8 hp (67 kW, 91.1 ps) at 6,000 rpm
 Torque : 98 lb·ft (13.5 kg/m, 119 Nm) at 4,000 rpm
 Valvetrain : SOHC (4 valves per cylinder)
 Fuel Control : Twin carburetor PGM-CARB

D15Z3
 VTEC-E
 Found in:
 1995–1997 Honda Civic MA9 (European Market)
 Displacement : 
 Bore and Stroke : 
 Rod Length : 137 mm
 Rod/Stroke : 1.62
 Compression : 9.3:1
 Power : 90 hp (67.1 kW, 91.3 PS) at 5500 rpm
 Torque : 98 lb·ft (13.5 kg/m, 133 Nm) at 4500 rpm
 Valvetrain : SOHC VTEC-E (3-4 valves per cylinder depending on engine speed)
 VTEC Switchover : 3,000 - 3,800 rpm (depending on engine load)
 Fuel Control : OBD-1 MPFI
 ECU code : P1G
 Redline : 6,000 rpm
 Fuel cutout : 6,300 rpm

D15Z4
 Found in:
 1996–2000 Honda Ballade/Civic in South Africa & Venezuela
 1996–2000 Honda Civic LXi/EXi in the Philippines/Middle East/Trinidad & Tobago
 Displacement : 
 Bore and Stroke : 
 Power :  at 5,800 rpm
 Torque :  at 4,200 rpm
 Redline : 6,900 rpm
 Rev-limiter: 7,400 rpm
 Valvetrain : SOHC non-VTEC, four valves per cylinder
 Piston code : P2CY
 Head Code : P2A-9
 Fuel Control : SFI (Sequential Fuel Injection)
 Ecu Code : P2C/P2E

D15Z6
SOHC VTEC-E
 Found in:
 1995–2000 Honda Civic 1.5i LS (European Market)
 Displacement : 
 Bore and Stroke : 
 Rod Length : 137 mm
 Compression : 9.6:1
 Power : 114 PS (84 kW) at 6,500 rpm
 Torque : 99 lb·ft (134 Nm) at 5,400 rpm
 VTEC Switchover : depending on load, max ~3,500 rpm in 5th gear
 Valvetrain : SOHC VTEC (3-4 valves per cylinder, depending on engine speed)
 Fuel Control : OBD-2a PGM-FI MPFI
 Ecu Code : P2Y
 Head Code : P2J
 Redline : 6,800 rpm
 Fuel cutout : 7,200 rpm

D15Z7
 3-stage VTEC
 Found in:
 1996–1999 Honda Civic VTi EK3 and Ferio Vi
 Displacement : 
 Piston Code: P2J
 Bore and Stroke : 
 Rod Length : 137 mm
 Rod/Stroke : 1.62
 Compression : 9.6:1
 Power : 128 hp (95.4 kW, 130 ps) at 7000 rpm
 Torque : 102 lb·ft (14.2 kg/m, 139 Nm) at 5300 rpm
 Valvetrain : SOHC VTEC (3-4 valves per cylinder, depending on engine speed)
 VTEC Switchover : 3200 and 5800 rpm
 Fuel Control : OBD-2 MPFI
 ECU Code : P2J
 Manual Transmission ECU Codes : P2J-003 (OBD2a), P2J-J11 (OBD2b)
 CVT Transmission ECU Codes : P2J-J61 (OBD2a), P2J-J71 (OBD2b)
 Lean burn capable.

D15Z8
 VTEC-E
 Found in:
 1997–2000 Honda Civic LS (MB3, MB9), (European Market)
 Displacement : 
 Bore and Stroke : 
 Rod Length : 137 mm
 Deck Height : 207 mm
 Compression : 9.6:1
 Power : 114 hp (85.0 kW, 116 ps) at 6500 rpm
 Torque : 95–99 lb·ft (13–14 kg/m, 128-134 Nm) :confirm? at 4500 rpm
 Head Code : P2J P2M
 ECU Code : P9L
 VTEC Switchover : 4000 rpm 
 Valvetrain : SOHC VTEC-E, 4 valves per cylinder

D16 series engines (1.6 liter) 
 Bore and Stroke: 
 Displacement:

D16A

 Found in:
 1997-1999 JDM Honda Domani (MB4)
 Bore and Stroke: see D16 Series Engines
 Displacement: see D16 Series Engines
 Compression : 9.3:1
 Power :  at 6600 rpm
 Torque: 144 Nm
 Redline : 7000 rpm
 VTEC Engages : 4800 rpm
 Valvetrain : SOHC (4 valves per cylinder)
 Fuel Control : OBD2a
 Head Code : P08
 ECU Code: PBB-J61

D16A1
 Found in:
 1986–89 Acura Integra (USA)
 Bore and Stroke: see D16 Series Engines
 Displacement: see D16 Series Engines
 Valvetrain: DOHC 16-valve (four valves per cylinder)
 Fuel Control :PGMFI
 CG Gearbox – Cable Transmission
 1986–1987: USDM Browntop
 Compression: 9.3:1
 Power:  at 6250 rpm
 Torque:  at 5500 rpm
 Piston Code: PG6B
 ECU Code: PG7, Vacuum Advance Distributor
 1988–1989: USDM Blacktop
 Compression: 9.5: 1
 Power:  at 6500 rpm
 Torque:  at 5500 rpm
 Piston Code: P29
 ECU Code: PG7, Electronic Advance Distributor

D16A3

 Found in:
 1986–89 Honda Integra (Australia)
 Bore and Stroke: see D16 Series Engines
 Displacement: see D16 Series Engines
 Compression : 9.5:1
 Power:  at 5600 rpm
 Torque: 140 Nm (14.3 kgm, 103 lbft) at 4800 rpm
 Valvetrain: DOHC 16-valve, four valves per cylinder
 Fuel Control: OBD-0 MPFI

D16A6
Also known as D16Z2.
 Found in:
 1988–1991 Honda Civic Si, CRX Si, 90-91 Civic EX (4dr), Civic Wagon RT4WD (USDM)
 1988–1995 Honda Civic Shuttle RT4WD (UK/Europe/Asia/AU/NZ)
 1989–1996 Rover 216/416 GSi/Tourer (UK/Europe)
 Bore and Stroke: see D16 Series Engines
 Displacement: see D16 Series Engines
 Rod Length: 137 mm
 Rod Ratio: 1.52~
 Compression: 9.1:1
 Power: 108 hp (80.5 kW, 110 ps) at 5600 rpm
 Note: 1988 engines were 105 hp (78.3 kW, 107 ps)
 Torque: 100 lb·ft (13.9 kg·m, 136 N·m) at 4800 rpm
 Redline: 6500 rpm (USA)
 Rev limited to: 7200 rpm
 Valvetrain: SOHC (4 valves per cylinder)
 Cam Gear: 38 tooth
 Fuel Control: OBD-0 MPFI
 Head Code: PM3
 ECU Code: PM6

D16A7
(Basically a D16A6 without the catalytic converter)
 Found in:
 1988–1991 Civic 1.6i (GTi) in New Zealand
 1988–1989 Civic models in Europe (ED4, ED7)
 1995 Civic models in New Zealand (EG4)
 1988–1995 Models in South Africa
 1994 Civic GTi (New Zealand)
 Ballade SH4 and SR4 (EE4 )
 Bore and Stroke: see D16 Series Engines
 Displacement: see D16 Series Engines
 Rod Length : 137 mm
 Compression : 9.6:1
 Power :  at 5900 rpm
 Torque :  at 4800 rpm
 Valvetrain : SOHC, four valves per cylinder
 ECU: PM6 (OBD-0) / P27 (OBD-1)?
 Fuel Control : OBD-0 Multi-point PGM-FI, OBD-1 (NZDM)

D16A8
 Found in:
 1988–1995 Civic/CRX/Concerto (UK/Europe/Australia)
 1992–1995 Rover 216/416 GTi (UK/Europe)
 1993–1997 Rover 216 Sport Coupé (Europe)
 Bore and Stroke: see D16 Series Engines
 Displacement: see D16 Series Engines
 Compression : 9.5:1
 Power :  at 6800 rpm
 Torque :  at 5900 rpm
 Valvetrain : DOHC (4 valves per cylinder)
 Fuel Control : OBD-0 and OBD-1 MPFI
 ECU Code : PP5 (OBD-0), P29 (OBD-1)
 Head Code : PM7
 Gearbox : L3

D16A9
(Same as D16A8 but without a catalytic converter)

 Found in:
 1988–1991 Concerto (UK/Europe)
 1988–1991 CRX 1.6i-16 (UK/Europe/South Africa)
 1990–1992 Ballade 160i-DOHC (South Africa)
 1988–1991 Civic 1.6i-16 (UK/Europe)
 1992–1993 Civic GTi (New Zealand)
 1989–1992 Rover 216/416 GTi (UK/Europe)
 1992–1995 Civic Si (Japanese, European venezuela and Peruvian version)
 Bore and Stroke: see D16 Series Engines
 Displacement: see D16 Series Engines
 Compression : 9.5:1
 Power : 125-129 hp (91.9-94.8 kW, 126-130 PS) at 6800 rpm
 Torque : 105 lb·ft (14.5 kg/m, 143 Nm) at 5700 rpm
 Valvetrain : DOHC 16 valve (4 valves per cylinder)
 Redline: 7,200 rpm
 Limit: 7,250 rpm
 Fuel Cut: 7800 RPM (PM7)
 Fuel Control : 88-91 OBD-0 MPFI (92-95 OBD-1)
 ECU Code: (P29 OBD1)
 Gearbox: non-LSD (1988-1991): L3, LSD (1992-1995): S20

D16B2
 Found in:
 1998–2001 Honda Civic Aerodeck MC1 1.6i LS/ES/SR
 1997–2000 Rover 416 Si Automatic
 Bore and Stroke: see D16 Series Engines
 Displacement: see D16 Series Engines
 Combustion Chamber Volume : 32.8 cc per cylinder
 Power : 116 hp (85 kW)
 Torque :  at ??? rpm
 Valvetrain : SOHC 16 Valve
 VTEC Switchover : Non-VTEC
 Fuel Control : OBD2
 ECU Code: ?

D16B5
(Largely identical to the D16Y5. The main differences are pistons, rods, camshaft, head gasket, intake manifold, and exhaust manifolds which are PDN rather than P2M)
 Found in:
 1998–2000 Honda Civic GX
 Bore and Stroke: see D16 Series Engines
 Displacement: see D16 Series Engines
 Rod Length : 137 mm
 Compression : 12.5:1
 Combustion Chamber Volume : 32.8 cc per cylinder
 Power :
 Torque :
 Valvetrain : SOHC VTEC-E
 VTEC Switchover :
 Fuel Control : OBD-2 MPFI
 ECU Code: PDN-A02

D16B6
Differences to the D16B7 (also in Accords) are unknown
 Found in:
 1999 Honda Accord (CG7/CH5, Europe)
 Bore and Stroke: see D16 Series Engines
 Displacement: see D16 Series Engines
 Power:  at 6400 rpm
 Torque:  at 5100 rpm
 Valvetrain: SOHC, four valves per cylinder
 Fuel control: PGM-FI
 Firing order 1,4-2,3
 ECU code: ??

D16V1
 VTEC (SOHC VTEC)	
 Found in:
 1999-2005 Honda Civic (European EM/EP2/ES/EU8)
 Bore and Stroke: see D16 Series Engines
 Displacement: see D16 Series Engines
 Compression: 10.4:1
 Power:  at 5600 rpm
 Torque:  at 4300 rpm
 Redline: 6250 rpm
 Rev Limit: 6500 rpm
 Valvetrain: SOHC, 4 valves per cylinder
 Fuel control: Multi-point fuel injection, PGM-FI
 Ignition timing: 8±2° BTDC at 700±50 rpm
 Firing order: 1 - 3 - 4 - 2
 ECU code: PMH

D16W1
 non-VTEC non Civic
 Found in:
 1999–2006 Honda HRV
 Bore and Stroke: see D16 series engines
 Displacement: see D16 series engines
 Power:  at 6200 rpm
 Torque:  at 3400 rpm
 Valvetrain: SOHC, four valves per cylinder
 Fuel control: PGM-FI
 ECU code :PEL

D16W3
 non-VTEC
 Found in:
 1998–2001 Honda Civic Aerodeck MC1 1.6i LS/SR
 Bore and Stroke: see D16 Series Engines
 Displacement: see D16 Series Engines
 Power : 116 hp (85 kW)
 Valvetrain : SOHC (4 valves per cylinder)

D16W4
 VTEC
 Found in:
 1999–2000 Honda Civic MB4 1.6i VTEC/ES
 1998–2001 Honda Civic Aerodeck MC1 1.6i VTEC/ES
 Bore and Stroke: see D16 Series Engines
 Displacement: see D16 Series Engines
 Power : 126 hp (93 kW) at 6600 rpm
 Valvetrain : SOHC (4 valves per cylinder)
Redline: 6800 rpm
Rev Limit: 7200 rpm
Piston Code: P2P
ECU Code: PDT
Fuel Control: OBD2-b 
VTEC switchover: 5500 rpm
Torque:  at 5500 rpm
Compression: 9.6:1

D16W5
 VTEC
 Found in:
 2000–2006 Honda HRV
 Bore and Stroke: see D16 Series Engines
 Displacement: see D16 Series Engines
 Redline: 6800 rpm
 Rev Limit: 7000 rpm
 Power : 
 Valvetrain : SOHC (4 valves per cylinder)
 Fuel Control: OBD-2

D16W7
 VTEC-E
 Found in:
 2004–2007 Honda Civic VTi / VTi-L (Asia)
 Bore and Stroke: see D16 Series Engines
 Displacement: see D16 Series Engines
 Compression: 10.9:1
 Power:  at 5600 rpm
 Torque: 112 lb·ft (15.5 kg/m, 152 Nm) at 4300 rpm
 Valvetrain: SOHC, four valves per cylinder
 Redline: 6100 rpm
 Limit: 6200 rpm
 Fuel Control: OBD-1 MPFI
 ECU Code: PM12
 Also found in 2001–2005 Honda Civic ES (Europe, Turkey, Singapore)
 Same as above, except:
 Power: 110 hp (82.0 kW, 81 kW) at 5600 rpm
 Torque: 112 lb·ft (15.5 kg/m, 152 Nm) at 4300 rpm
 Redline: 6100 rpm
 Limit: 6200 rpm

D16W9
 Found in :
 2001–2005 Honda Civic VTi (Philippines, Pakistan)
 Bore and Stroke: 
 Displacement:1.6L, 1,590 cc (97 cu in)  
 Compression Ratio: 10.5:1
 Power:  at 6600 rpm
 Torque:  at 5500 rpm
 Redline Limiter: 7200 rpm
 Valvetrain: SOHC VTEC3 (4 valves per cylinder)
 1st VTEC Switchover: 2500 rpm
 2nd VTEC Switchover: 5500 rpm
 Fuel Control: EFI PGM-FI (Programmed Fuel Injection) OBD-2.

D16Y1
 Found in :
 1992–1995 Honda Civic VTi (AUS)
 Bore and Stroke: see D16 Series Engines
 Displacement: see D16 Series Engines
 Compression: 9.3:1
 Power:  at 6600 rpm
 Torque:  at 5200 rpm
 Redline: 7200 rpm
 Valvetrain: SOHC VTEC (4 valves per cylinder)
 VTEC Switchover: 5000 rpm
 Fuel Control: OBD-1 MPFI
 Head Code: P08
 ECU Code: P28

D16Y2
 Found in :
 1995–1997 Honda Civic MB1 SR 
 Bore and Stroke: see D16 Series Engines
 Displacement: see D16 Series Engines
 Compression: 9.5:1
 Power:  at 6500 rpm
 Torque: 106 lb·ft (14.8 kg/m, 144 Nm) at 5200 rpm
 Valvetrain: SOHC VTEC (four valves per cylinder)
 Cylinder Head: P08
 VTEC Switchover: 5500 rpm
 Fuel Control: OBD-1 MPFI
 ECU Code: P1H
 Transmission: S20

D16Y3
 Found in :
 1995–1997 Honda Civic MB1 LS (UK/Europe)
 1996–1997 Rover 416 SLI Auto (UK/Europe)
 Bore and Stroke: see D16 Series Engines
 Displacement: see D16 Series Engines
 Compression: 9.4:1
 Power:  at 5600 rpm
 Torque:  at 5100 rpm
 Redline: 7200 rpm
 Valvetrain: SOHC (four valves per cylinder)
 Fuel Control: OBD-1 MPFI
The camshaft is the same as D16A6

D16Y4
 Found in:
 1998–2000 Civic 1.6 iES (Turkey)
 1996–2000 Civic CXi, GL, GLi (New Zealand, Australia)
 Bore and Stroke: see D16 Series Engines
 Displacement: see D16 Series Engines
 Compression: 9.4:1
 Power:  at 6400 rpm
 Torque:  at 5000 rpm
 Redline: 6800 rpm
 Rev-limiter: 7200 rpm
 Fuel Control: OBD-2 MPFI
 Head Code: P2A-2
 ECU Code: P2K
 Rod /Stroke Ratio: 1.52
 Rod Length: 152 mm
 Deck Height: 212

D16Y5
 VTEC-E  
 Found in :
 1996–2000 Honda Civic HX
 1996 Honda Civic EX (sedan Peruvian version)
 Bore and Stroke: see D16 Series Engines
 Displacement: see D16 Series Engines
 Rod Length: 137 mm
 Rod/Stroke: 1.52
 Compression: 9.4:1
 Power:  at 5600 rpm
 Torque:  at 4500 rpm
 Valvetrain: SOHC VTEC-E (4 valves per cylinder)
 Fuel Control: OBD-2 MPFI
 Head Code: P2J
 1996–2000 Honda Civic VTI sedan (Australia)
 Bore and Stroke: see D16 Series Engines
 Displacement: see D16 Series Engines
 Compression: ?:?
 Power:  at 5800 rpm
 Torque:  at ??? rpm
 Valvetrain: SOHC VTEC-E (4 valves per cylinder)
 Fuel Control: OBD-2 MPFI
 Head Code: P2J
 ECU Code: P2N
 Piston Code : P2MY
 Redline : 7200

D16Y7
 Found in:
 1996–2000 Honda Civic DX/VP/LX/CX
 1998–2000 Honda Civic Special Edition – SE/EX (Canada)
 1996–1997 Honda Del Sol S
 1996–1997 Honda Civic Coupé LSI
 Bore and Stroke: see D16 Series Engines
 Displacement: see D16 Series Engines
 Compression: 9.4:1
 Power:  at 6200 rpm
 Torque: 103 lb·ft (140 N.m) at 4600 rpm
 Redline: 6800 rpm
 Rev-limiter: 7200 rpm
 Valvetrain: SOHC (4 valves per cylinder)
 Fuel Control: OBD2 MPFI
 Head Code: P2A-2
 Piston Code: P2E
 ECU Code: P2E

D16Y8 

1.6 litre 16-Valve, SOHC VTEC
Also available in New Zealand and Pakistan under the code D16Y6 
 Found in:
 1996–1997 Honda Del Sol Si (US)
 1996–2000 Honda Civic EX (US, UK)
 1996-1998 Honda Civic Coupe (UK)
 1996–2000 Honda Civic Si (Canada)
 1997-2000 Acura 1.6 EL (Canada)
 1996-2000 Honda Civic Sedan Vti-E (ABS) Thailand
 Bore and Stroke: see D16 Series Engines
 Displacement: see D16 Series Engines
Redline: 6800 rpm
Rev Limit: 7200 rpm
ECU Code: P2P
Piston Code: P2P
Fuel Control: OBD2-b 
VTEC switchover: 5,600 rpm
Power:  at 6600 rpm
Torque:  at 5500 rpm
Compression: 9.6:1
Deck Height: 8.347 inches
Rod Length: 5.394 inches

D16Y9 
equal to D16Y4
non VTEC
 Found in:
 1996–2000 Honda Ballade/Civic in South Africa and Venezuela
 Bore and Stroke: see D16 Series Engines
 Displacement: see D16 Series Engines
 Power:  at 5900 rpm (AT:  at 5500 rpm)
 Torque: 108 lb·ft (14.9 kg/m, 146 Nm) at 4000 rpm
 Valvetrain: SOHC (4 valves per cylinder)
 Fuel Control: OBD2A MPFI
 Redline: 7200 rpm
 Rev-limiter: 7400 rpm
 Valvetrain: SOHC (4 valves per cylinder)
 Head Code: P2A-9
 Piston Code: P2K
 ECU Code: P2K 2 connectors
 The D16Y9 in South Africa has different power figures:
 Power: 89 kW (119 hp) at 6400 rpm
 Torque: 146 Nm (108 lbf-ft) at 5500 rpm
 Information found in April 1998 CAR Magazine (SA)

D16Z5 
(Basically the same engine as the D16A9, but now with a catalytic converter and lambda sensor)
 Found in:
 September 1989 – 1992 Honda CRX (European market)
 Bore and Stroke: see D16 Series Engines
 Displacement: see D16 Series Engines
 Compression: 9.5:1
 Power:  at 6800 rpm
 Torque:  at 5700 rpm
 Valvetrain: DOHC, four valves per cylinder
 Cam Gear: 34 tooth
 Fuel Control: OBD-0 PGM-FI
 Head Code: P7
 Piston Code: PM7
 ECU Code: PM7
 Clutch Kit: 210 mm disk

D16Z6

VTEC 
Found in
1992-1995 Honda Civic Si (US)
1992–1995 Honda Civic EX, EX-V
1992–1995 Honda Civic ESi (European Market)
1993–1995 Honda Del Sol Si (US)
1993–1996 Honda Del Sol ESi (European)
 Bore and Stroke: see D16 Series Engines
 Displacement: see D16 Series Engines
Rod Length: 137 mm
Rod Ratio: 1.52~
Compression: 9.2:1
Power:  at 6600 rpm
Torque: 106 lb·ft (14.7 kg/m, 144 Nm) at 5200 rpm
Volumetric Efficiency: 87.69%
Redline: 7200 rpm
Fuel cut: over 7400 rpm
VTEC switchover: 4800 rpm
Fuel control: OBD-1 PGM-FI
Head code: P08
ECU code: P28

D16Z7
VTEC
Found in
1996–2000 Honda Civic EX Coupé
1994 Honda Civic Rtsi 4wd
 Bore and Stroke: see D16 Series Engines
 Displacement: see D16 Series Engines
Rod Length: 137 mm
Rod Ratio: 1.52~
Compression: 9.6:1
Power: 127 bhp at 6600 rpm
Torque: 107 lb·ft at 5500 rpm
Redline: 7200 rpm

D16Z9
VTEC
 Found in:
 1994–1995 Civic Coupé (EJ1) 1.6i ESi European
 1994–1995 Civic Sedan (EH5) 1.6i EX  US
 Bore and Stroke: see D16 Series Engines
 Displacement: see D16 Series Engines
 Compression: 9.3:1
 Power: 130 hp (95.6 kW, 129,2 PS) at 6600 rpm
 Torque: 106 lbf (144 Nm) at 5200 rpm
 VTEC switchover: 4,800 rpm
 Redline: 7200 rpm
 Fuel cut: 7500 rpm
 Valvetrain: SOHC VTEC (4 valves per cylinder)
 Fuel control: OBD-1 MPFI
 ECU code: P28

ZC

A few D-series variants are labelled (usually JDM), but they are not truly a different series. They are similar to the D16Y4, D16A8, D16Z6, D16A1, D16A3, D16A6, D16A9 and D16Z5 engines.

There are both SOHC and DOHC ZC engines. The non-VTEC SOHC ZC is similar to the D16A6 ('91–'96) and D16Y4 ('96–2000) engine, but with more aggressive cam timing. The SOHC VTEC ZC is similar to the D16Z6 ('91–'96). The DOHC ZC is similar to the D16A1, D16A3, D16A8, D16A9 and D16Z5 engines.

SOHC ZC VTEC

VTEC
Found in
1991–1993 Honda Civic Ferio EJ3 (JDM)
1992–1995 Honda Civic EJ1 (JDM)
1992–1995 Honda Domani MA4 (JDM)
Displacement : 1590 cc (97 cu in)
Bore and Stroke : 75 mm × 90 mm (3.0 in × 3.5 in)
Rod Length : 137MM
Rod/Stroke : 1.52
Compression : 9.2:1
Power :  at 6600 rpm
Torque :  at 5200 rpm
Redline : 7200 rpm
Fuel Cut : 7300 rpm
VTEC Switchover : 5500 rpm
Fuel Control : OBD-1 MPFI
ECU Code : P70 (Domani), P91 (Civic Coupé), P29

DOHC ZC

Non-VTEC
Found in (JDM)
1984–1987 Honda Ballade CRX AS
1984–1987 Honda Civic AT
1985–1987 Honda Integra AV/DA1 (Lower trim packages equipped with Single Carburetor)
1986–1991 Honda CRX EF7
1992–1995 Honda Civic EH1
Displacement : 1590 cc
Bore and Stroke : 75 mm X 90 mm
1984–1987 Compression : 9.3:1 1988–1989 Compression : 9.5: 1
Single Carburetor :  at 6800 rpm; Torque : 92 lb·ft (12.8 kg/m, 126 Nm) at 5500 rpm
1984–1987 Power :  at 6250 rpm; Torque : 99 lb·ft (13.7 kg/m, 134 Nm) at 5500 rpm
1988–1989 Power :  at 6500 rpm; Torque : 103 lb·ft (14.0 kg/m, 137 Nm) at 5500 rpm
1988–1991 Power :  at 6800 rpm; Torque : 106 lb·ft (14.7 kg/m, 144 Nm) at 5700 rpm
Valvetrain : DOHC
Piston Code 1986-'87 : PG6
Piston Code 1988-'89 : PM7
Fuel Control : OBD-0 MPFI

Euro Mk1 ('85-'87) 1.6 CRX's are fitted with an engine designated "ZC1" which is a higher spec  version of the D16A1. These were later replaced by the D16A8 or B16A, depending on the specs.

1st Gen ZC 
Identified by: External coil, small distributor, dual butterfly TB, cam cover bolts on top, brown/gold cam cover. Large cam pulleys. +3cc PG6B pistons, non-pent roof combustion chamber. As a ZC it appeared in JDM AV Integra Si and JDM E-AT Civic/CR-X Si. Commonly produced at the time but now over twenty years old and getting harder to find. D-series version is called D16A1, 1986–1987.

2nd Gen ZC (rarest) 
Identified by: Internal coil, large distributor, single butterfly TB mounted on slight angle forward, bolts on top of cam cover, black cam cover, large cam pulleys. +7cc PM7 pistons, 43 cc Pent roof combustion chamber. As a ZC appeared in JDM facelift AV bodied Integra Si did not appear in Civic or CR-X, rarest ZC only produced for less than one year. D-series version D16A1 '88-'89 (sometimes +7cc P29 pistons)

3rd Gen ZC 
Identified by: Internal coil, large distributor, single butterfly TB. Black cam cover. Cam cover bolts on the sides. Small cam pulleys. Inlet Manifold stamped PM7. +7cc PM7 pistons, 43 cc Pent roof combustion chamber. As a "ZC" this appeared in the JDM EF3 Civic and EF7 CR-X, and also in the JDM Honda Quint Integra GSi (DA1 chassis). This is the most commonly produced ZC, manufactured in Japan from end of '87 through to early '91 D-series version D16A8/9 (Euro Civic Si) (sometimes +7cc P29 pistons)

4th Gen ZC 
Identified by: Internal coil. OBD1 EFi system (grey plug). No cam angle sensor on exhaust cam, now located in distributor. Rubber plug where cam angle sensor would mount. Black cam cover. No PGM-EFi plate on the inlet manifold, replaced with three ribs instead. P29 stamped on inlet manifold. MAP sensor on TB. +7cc PM7 pistons, pent roof combustion chamber. As a ZC only appeared in EG5 Civic bodies, no Integra or CRX received this engine. Reasonably common produced from '92 to '94. (20th Anniversary edition & Japanese car of the year) D-series version D16A8/9 (Euro & Australia Civic Si) (sometimes +7cc P29 pistons)
Hond

D17 series engines (1.7 liter)

D17A
 Found in:
 2001–2005 Honda Civic (Japan)
 Displacement : 
 Bore and Stroke: 75 × 94.4 mm (3.0 × 3.72 in)
 Compression : 10.5:1
 Power : (lean burn) 120 hp (85.8 kW, 120 ps) at 4900 rpm; 140 hp (96.9 kW, 140 PS) at 6750 rpm
 Torque :  at 4800 rpm
 Rev-limiter : 7200 rpm
 Valvetrain : SOHC (4 valves per cylinder)
 Fuel Control : OBD-2 MPFI
ECU 37820 PLR J01-13 (manual transmission)

D17A1
 Found in:
 2001–2005 Honda Civic DX/LX/VP
 Displacement : 
 Bore and Stroke : 
 Compression : 9.5:1
 Power : 122 hp (85.8 kW, 124 ps) at 6400 rpm
 Torque : 110 lb·ft (15.2 kg/m, 149 Nm) at 4500 rpm
 RPM redline: 6750 rpm
 Rev-limiter : 7200 rpm
 Valvetrain : SOHC (4 valves per cylinder)
 Fuel Control : OBD-2 MPFI

D17A2
 VTEC
 Found in:
 2001–2005 Honda Civic EX (US only)
 2001–2005 Honda Civic LX (Europe)
 2001–2005 Honda Civic Si (Canada only)
 2001–2005 Acura 1.7 EL (Canada only)
 2000–2007 Honda Stream 1.7 (Japan)
 2004-2007 Honda FR-V 1.7 (Europe)
 Displacement: 
 Bore and Stroke: 
 Rod Length: 137 mm
 Rod/Stroke: 1.45
 Compression: 9.9:1
 Power (North America):  at 6,300 rpm
 Torque (North America): 114 lb·ft (155 Nm) at 4,800 
 RPM redline: 6,800 rpm
 Rev-limiter: 7,200 rpm
 Valvetrain: SOHC VTEC, four valves per cylinder
 VTEC Switchover: 3,200 rpm
 Fuel Control: OBD-2 MPFI

D17A5
 VTEC-E
 Found in:
 2001–2005 Honda Civic 170i VTEC (South Africa)
 2004 Honda Stream VTEC (Indonesia)
 Displacement : 
 Bore and Stroke : 
 Compression : 9.9:1
 Power :  at 6,300 rpm
 Torque :  at 4,800 rpm
 Valvetrain : SOHC VTEC-E Lean Burn (4 valves per cylinder)
 VTEC Switchover : 3,200 rpm
 Fuel Control : OBD-2 MPFI

D17A6
 VTEC-E
 Found in:
 2001–2005 Honda Civic HX
 Displacement : 
 Bore and Stroke : 
 Compression : 9.9:1
 Power :  at 6,100 rpm
 Torque :  at 4,500 rpm
 Valvetrain : SOHC VTEC-E Lean Burn (4 valves per cylinder)
 VTEC Switchover : 2,300 rpm
 Fuel Control : OBD-2 MPFI

D17A7
 Found in:
 2001–2005 Honda Civic GX
 Fuel CNG (Compressed Natural Gas)
 Displacement : 
 Bore and Stroke : 
 Compression : 12.5:1
 Power :  at 6,100 rpm
 Torque : 98 lb·ft (13.5 kg/m, 133 Nm) at 4,000 rpm
 Valvetrain : SOHC (4 valves per cylinder)
 Fuel Control : OBD-2 MPFI

D17A8
 Found in:
2001-2005 Honda Civic Coupé LS (Europe)
 Displacement : 
 Bore and Stroke : 
 Compression : 9.9:1
 Power :  at 6100 rpm
 Torque : 110 lb·ft (15.2 kg/m, 149 Nm) at 4500 rpm
 RPM redline : 6750 rpm
 Rev-limiter : 7200 rpm
 Valvetrain : SOHC (4 valves per cylinder)
 Fuel Control : OBD-2 MPFI

D17A9
 VTEC-E
 Found in:
 2001–2005 Honda Civic Coupe ES (Europe)
 Displacement : 
 Bore and Stroke : 
 Rod Length : 140 mm
 Rod/Stroke : 1.48
 Compression : 9.9:1
 Power :  at 6,300 rpm
 Torque :  at 4,800 rpm
 RPM redline: 6,800 rpm
 Rev-limiter: 7,200 rpm
 Valvetrain: SOHC VTEC-E, four valves per cylinder
 VTEC Switchover: 2,500 - 3,200 rpm
 Fuel Control: OBD-2 MPFI

D17Z3
 VTEC
 Found in:
 2001–2006 Honda Civic EX (Brazil only)
 2005–2006 Honda Civic LXL (Brazil only)
 Displacement: 
 Bore and Stroke: 
 Rod Length: 140 mm
 Rod/Stroke: 1.48
 Compression: 9.9:1
 Power:  at 6,300 rpm
 Torque: 114 lb·ft (15.8 kg/m, 154 Nm) at 4,800 rpmJapan:  at 4,800 rpm
 RPM redline: 6,800 rpm
 Rev-limiter: 7,000 rpm
 Valvetrain: SOHC VTEC, four valves per cylinder
 VTEC Switchover: 4,800 rpm
 Fuel Control: OBD-2 MPFI

D17Z2
 SOHC
 Found in:
 2001–2006 Honda Civic LX (Brazil only)
 2004 Honda Civic LXL (Brazil only)
 Displacement: 
 Bore and Stroke: 
 Rod Length: 140 mm
 Rod/Stroke: 1.48
 Compression: 9.9:1
 Power:  at 6,300 rpm
 Torque: 114 lb·ft (15.8 kg/m, 154 Nm) at 4,800 rpmJapan:  at 4,800 rpm
 RPM redline: 6,800 rpm
 Rev-limiter: 7,000 rpm
 Valvetrain: SOHC, four valves per cylinder
 Fuel Control: OBD-2 MPFI

References

External links

D
Straight-four engines